The Portrait of Mehmet II is a painting by the Venetian artist Gentile Bellini, depicting the Ottoman sultan, Mehmet the Conqueror. It was painted in 1480 while Bellini was in Constantinople on a diplomatic mission. This painting is a record of the significant economic and diplomatic ties that existed between Venice and the Ottoman Empire in the 15th century. Before this painting, the Ottomans had recently conquered Constantinople. This put the Venetian Republic in a situation where they had no choice but to accept a peace treaty from Mehmet the conqueror in 1479. Venice was actively tied with Constantinople through commercial links because of their close proximity to the Mediterranean sea. The importation of raw silk, cotton, illuminated manuscripts, inlaid metalwork, and spices would have ground to a halt without this peace treaty. After a peace treaty is brokered between the Venetian Republic and the Ottoman Empire, the Sultan Mehmet II decided that he would like an Italian painter to be in residence at his court and paint for him; this task was placed upon Gentile Bellini.

In the 19th century, the painting of Sultan Mehmet was in poor condition and had been heavily repainted. There was too much mishandling and over cleaning which resulted in many art historians being unable to confirm the painting is by Bellini's hand. Now art historians agree that about 10% of what we see in this painting is done by the Renaissance master Gentile. Regardless this painting shows off the skills of Gentile Bellini who was well regarded by the Sultan, this painting shows off clever combinations of European and Islamic culture which reinforces the Sultan's choice of wanting a Venetian painter in his court. Bellini's portrait left a lasting influence on Ottoman painting; several paintings, one attributed to Shiblizade Ahmed, exist that derive their compositions from Bellini's. The Portrait of Mehmet II is now held in the National Gallery, London.

Description

Mehmet is depicted wearing his red caftan layered on top with a lavish fur veil in addition to his headdress consisting of a wrapped turban over a red taj; this serves two purposes for indicating his rank and religious identity. A piece of Ottoman embroidery hangs down the front of the frame, encrusted with jewels. Art historians believe because Mehmed requested an Italian artist at the time; he wanted a very naturalistic likeness to be painted of him and wanted to be viewed as an Italian ruler in a stylized natural portrait. The rounding voluminous forms of Mehmet's garb and turban give great contrast to the sharp, thin, and angular features of his hooked nose and pointed chin. Bellini used classical conventions at the time in Italy to portray Mehmed as being distanced from the viewer. Surrounding the portrait is a painted frame consisting of an arch reminiscent of classicizing portals from Venice in that period, as well as the parapet draped with a cloth. The lower left of the painting has the inscription “Victor Orbis” or “Conqueror of the World”. Another partial inscription remains in the painting In reference to Bellini's artistry “… the true skill of Gentile Bellini, nature's golden soldier, recalls the sultan's [appearance], [and] represents all things in their particularities… [Bellini] made this same image on the 15thday of the month of November 1480.” This inscription is in such bad shape it is hard for art historians to confidently translate most of it. Looking closely at the painting there are obvious inconsistencies or misconnections. Considering the arch and overall painting outside of the figure itself, it is polished, well painted yet incredibly flimsy looking; it frames Mehmet perfectly at the top but then his body is hidden by the sides. Mehmet looks blurred in comparison to the architecture surrounding him. It is almost as if the background, middleground, and foreground of this painting have been combined together.

History

Bellini's stay in the Ottoman Empire

On January 25, 1479, seven months after the end of war between the Ottoman Empire and Venice, Sultan Mehmet took the opportunity to begin a diplomatic relationship with Venice. The mission was to request a talented Venetian painter to be at Mehmed's disposal, which resulted in the loan of Gentile Bellini. Bellini's position in the eyes of the sultan was embellished by a published account by Jacopo Filippo Foresti da Bergamo in 1490, conceivably in partnership with Bellini himself. It stated: “His talent one day reached the ears of Mehmed, Prince of the Turks, who burning with desire of seeing him, wrote humbly to the Venetian Senate with a request that it should as a great favor send [Gentile] to him in Istanbul as a gift. When he arrived ... in order that his entire art might be tested even further. [Mehmed] required that he himself be rendered in his own form. And when the emperor beheld the image so similar to himself, he admired the man's powers and said that he surpassed all other painters who ever existed.”  There is no evidence Bellini was ever requested by name, contrary to Foresti's claim, which was subsequently taken up by Vasari himself in the same manner. It was recorded that Mehmet asked for a “good painter”, meaning one who was good at portraiture. Even though the painting by Bellini of Mehmet II is the only authenticated work from his stay in Constantinople, there are other works attributed to Bellini that are related to his stay in Istanbul. There's a double portrait of a young man with Mehmet, now privately owned in Switzerland. This painting had a very old label attached to it which identified Bellini as the painter and the subjects as Mehmet II and his son Jem, the younger brother of the predecessor to the throne Beyazit. There are also sketches of a young woman and a janissary which live in The British Museum.

Provenance

The painting is inscribed in the bottom corner “November 15, 1480”, Six months after this painting was made Mehmet II died from health complications stemming from gout and edema of the legs. Art historians believed Mehmet's successor Bayezid II sold many of his father's portraits after his death. Bayezid disapproved of his father's commissioned paintings, but he also sold the paintings to help finance a large mosque complex established ca. 1500. Historians believe the painting could have been bought by Venetian merchants in Levant and in the early 16th century and brought to Venice where another painting of Mehmet by an unknown artist would have been made using the painting by Gentile as a type of prototype. Bellini's portrait of the Sultan was observed using X-ray imagery while at its current residence at the National Gallery in London. The X-ray revealed that there was no trace of the Sultan's face remaining in the painting, while the rest of the details of the painting are still visible, such as the turban, textiles, arch, and crowns. An iconoclastic act is the best explanation for such deliberate localized damage done to the face of Mehmet. This was not uncommon in the Ottoman Empire; to make an offending image inanimate, they would destroy the face. There are later examples in the manuscript of Semailname of 1579, which there is repainting of sultan's faces that have been destroyed at some point.

Interpretation and symbolic meaning

The three crowns shown on the backside of Bellini's medal representing the sultan are a heraldic device that was also repeated on both sides of his painting of the Sultan. The three crowns would have been easily referenced by Europeans familiar with the Swedish royal coat of arms or as reference to the three realms (Papal triregnum). However, in the context of images of Mehmet, the three crowns probably reference Magna Grecia or Southern Italy, Trebizond, and Asia. Looking closely at the painting by Bellini, there is an obscure seventh crown embroidered in the draped fabric in the forward-most portion of the painting. In the past, the seven crowns were suggested as defining Mehmed's position in the Ottoman dynasty. Another portrait probably made in Venice around c.1510 of Mehmed seems to show that the seven crowns were not of significance, at least not in the way past historians thought they could have been. This painting was done about 31 years later and omits the seventh crown, meaning that it may not have been as integral to Mehmet's identity as previously thought.

In other media
In Marcel Proust novel Remembrance of Things Past, the character Bloch's appearance as a boy is likened to the portrait of Mehmet II by M. Swann.

References

https://thamesandhudsonusa.com/books/paintings-in-proust-a-visual-companion-to-in-search-of-lost-time-softcover

Bibliography
 Rodini, Elizabeth. 2020. Gentile Bellini's Portrait of Sultan Mehmed II: Lives and Afterlives of an Iconic Image. London: I. B. Tauris & Company
 Carboni, Stefano. 2007. Venice and the Islamic World: 828–1797.  New York: Metropolitan Museum of Art.
 Campbell, Caroline, and Alan Chong. 2005. Bellini and the East. London: National Gallery Co.
 Harper, James G. 2011. The Turk and Islam in the Western Eye, 1450–1750: Visual imagery before Orientalism. Farnham: Ashgate.
 Karpeles, Eric. 2017. Paintings in Proust, A Visual Companion to In Search of Lost Time.

1480 paintings
Paintings by Gentile Bellini
Portraits of monarchs
Collections of the National Gallery, London
Mehmed the Conqueror